is a municipality in Vestland county, Norway. It is located in the traditional district of Sunnfjord. The administrative centre is the village of Askvoll. Other villages in the municipality include Holmedal, Kvammen, and Stongfjorden. The most important industries in Askvoll today are Helle Knivfabrikk (a knife factory), Bulandet Fiskeindustri (fish industry), and Sigurd Løkeland Hermetikkfabrikk (a producer of crabs).

The  municipality is the 255th largest by area out of the 356 municipalities in Norway. Askvoll is the 227th most populous municipality in Norway with a population of 2,951.

The municipality stretches from the Bulandet islands in the west and Sunnfjord Municipality in east. Alden Mountain (known as the "Norwegian Horse") is located on the island of Alden in Askvoll.

In 2016, the chief of police for Vestlandet formally suggested a reconfiguration of police districts and stations. He proposed that the police station in Askvoll be closed.

General information

Askvoll was established as a municipality on 1 January 1838 (see formannskapsdistrikt law). The original municipality was identical to the Askvoll parish (prestegjeld) with the sub-parishes of Askvoll, Vilnes, Øn, and Hyllestad.  In 1862, the two southernmost sub-parishes of Øn and Hyllestad (population: 2,475) were separated from Askvoll and (along with the Bø sub-parish from Lavik municipality) formed the new municipality of Hyllestad. This left Askvoll with 2 sub-parishes and a population of 3,065.

On 1 January 1888, several farms in the Hersvikbygda area on the northern part of the island of Sula and the smaller surrounding islands (population: 317) were transferred from Askvoll municipality to the neighboring municipality of Utvær. During the 1960s, there were many municipal mergers across Norway due to the work of the Schei Committee. On 1 January 1964, the parts of the municipalities of Vevring (population: 407) and Bru (population: 92) that were located south of the Førdefjorden were merged into Askvoll municipality. This gave Askvoll a population of 3,585. On 1 January 1990, Askvoll and Fjaler did a land trade: the Fjaler farms of Vårdal, Holmedal, Rivedal, and part of Hestad (population: 731) were transferred to Askvoll; and the Askvoll farms of Fure, Folkestad, and Våge (population: 482) were transferred to Fjaler.

Name
The municipality (originally the parish) is named after the farm Askvoll, since the first Askvoll Church was built there. The first element is askr which means ash tree and the last element is vǫllr which means meadow.

Coat of arms
The coat of arms was granted on 5 January 1990. The arms show an old medieval stone cross on a green background. The cross represents the Korssundkrossen, which is connected to several stories of St. Olav.

Local Churches
The Church of Norway has one parish within the municipality of Askvoll. It is part of the Sunnfjord prosti (deanery) in the Diocese of Bjørgvin.

Government
All municipalities in Norway, including Askvoll, are responsible for primary education (through 10th grade), outpatient health services, senior citizen services, unemployment and other social services, zoning, economic development, and municipal roads. The municipality is governed by a municipal council of elected representatives, which in turn elect a mayor.  The municipality falls under the Sogn og Fjordane District Court and the Gulating Court of Appeal.

Municipal Council
The municipal council  of Askvoll is made up of 21 representatives that are elected to four year terms. The party breakdown of the council is as follows:

Mayor
The mayor  of a municipality in Norway is a representative of the majority party of the municipal council who is elected to lead the council. Ole André Klausen of the Conservative Party was elected mayor in 2017 to finish out the 2015–2019 term after the previous mayor who left the job, because she was elected to parliament in 2017.

The mayors of Askvoll (incomplete list):
2017–present: Ole André Klausen (H)
2011-2017: Frida Melvær (H)
2003-2011: Aud Kari Steinsland (Ap)
1993-2003: Kjellaug Veivåg Høyvik (Sp)
1988-1993: Jorunn Ringstad (Sp)
1972-1988: Kåre Ness (Sp)

Geography

Of this,  are on the mainland while the remaining  are made up of islands and skerries along its  coastline. To the west, lies the North Sea, to the north is the municipalities of Flora and Naustdal, to the east are the municipalities of Førde and Gaular, and to the south are the municipalities of Fjaler and Solund. The majority of the municipality is on the mainland between the Førdefjorden (in the north) and the Dalsfjorden (in the south). The Bulandet archipelago lies in the westernmost part of the municipality. There are many other islands between Bulandet and the mainland, notably Værlandet, Alden, and Atløyna. Geita Lighthouse lies on a very small island off the coast of Askvoll.

Attractions

Birdlife
Askvoll has many seabird reserves within the municipality. Otherwise mainland Askvoll provides habitat that is typical for the region. These however have restrictions, especially during the breeding season. One area that is good for birding is the Askvika nature reserve. This wetland area has a rich bird life with 69 recorded species.

Bulandet

Bulandet is Norway´s westernmost fishing community. Bulandet includes 365 islands and has approximately 270 inhabitants. During the summer, Bulandet is a favourite spot for boaters and tourists staying in cottages and fisherman cabins. The name "Bulandet" comes from the numerous wharf-side cabins here, known as "bu". The Nordsjøporten road is not only important for traffic and communication in the area but also allows for a fantastic journey through the islands.

Værlandet
At the mouth of the fjord, near Alden Mountain, is Værlandet island. Værlandet has a population of approximately 200 people. Fishing and fish farming are the most important industries, but both tourism and the export of high quality stone (breccia) to Italy are expanding. There is a collection of picturesque small houses on the water's edge in Værøyhamna harbour.

Alden

Also known as the "Norwegian Horse", Alden Mountain is an old and pronounced landmark for sailors along the coast. There is a marked path to the top, accessible using the scheduled boat service from Askvoll.

Blegja

Stongfjord Industries
Stongfjord Industries is Norway's oldest aluminium factory, and it is located in the village of Stongfjorden. British Aluminium Company started hydropower plant development in 1906, and produced aluminium from 1908 to 1945. Traces of the English industry are still apparent in the form of private houses, tennis courts, and football fields.

Vilnes Church
The Vilnes Church on the island of Atløyna is a medieval wooden church constructed in 1674.

Ingólfur Arnarson
The Ingólfur Arnarson statue in Rivedal is a monument to the pioneer spirit in the Dalsfjorden prior to the year 1000. Together with his brother, Ingólfur Arnarson he discovered Iceland, and laid the groundwork for the first Norwegian settlement there.

Notable people 
 Anders Askevold (1834 in Askvoll – 1900) a Norwegian painter of landscapes and animal paintings
 Nikolaus Gjelsvik (1866 in Vevring – 1938) a Norwegian jurist and law professor
 Arve Furset (born 1964 in Askvoll) a Norwegian composer, jazz musician (piano, keyboards) and music producer
 Alexander Breidvik (born 1986 in Askvoll) TV3 talent contest winner and retired Norwegian footballer

References

External links

Municipal fact sheet from Statistics Norway 
Google map showing Askvoll

 
Municipalities of Vestland
1838 establishments in Norway